Průcha (feminine Průchová) is a Czech surname, it may refer to:
 Jaroslav Průcha, Czech actor
 Petr Průcha, Czech ice hockey player
 Francis Paul Prucha, American Jesuit, historian, professor emeritus of history at Marquette University 
 Vlasta Průchová, Czech jazz singer

Czech-language surnames